Tomislav Piplica (born 5 April 1969) is a Bosnian football manager who formerly played as goalkeeper. His nickname is "Pipi" and he is considered to be a cult-goalkeeper, in Germany as well as in Bosnia and Herzegovina.

Playing career

Club
Piplica has played in his career for NK Iskra Bugojno, NK Zagreb, NK Istra 1961, HNK Segesta, NK Samobor and FC Energie Cottbus.

He is famous not only as a cult-goalkeeper. but also for well known goalkeeping blunders. He is especially well remembered for his own goal against Borussia Mönchengladbach in 2002, in which he appeared to head the ball into his own net, after standing rooted to his line. In this particular game Energie Cottbus was leading 3–2, but with four minutes to go, Piplica's howler leveled the game at 3–3, and it finished that way.

Nevertheless, Piplica has a cult status with Energie fans, who nicknamed him "Pipi", and for the club president Ulrich Lepsch who claims that he was always special with special status in Cottbus.

Until the end of 2012, Piplica held the post of sports director of SC Hartenfels Torgau 04 and he also helped as a coach. On 9 November 2012, Piplica announced at the age of 43 years his playing comeback as a goalkeeper in the sixth division side FC Eilenburg, as their goalkeeper had broken his arm in an accident.

International
As a teenager Piplica was part of the Yugoslavian squad that won the 1987 FIFA Under-20 World Cup. However, as a backup goalkeeper to Dragoje Leković, he didn't get a single minute of action throughout the six matches. 

Piplica made his senior debut for Bosnia and Herzegovina in a March 2001 World Cup qualification match against Austria in Sarajevo and has earned a total of 8 caps, scoring no goals. His final international was an August 2002 friendly match against Serbia and Montenegro.

Coaching career
After retiring he was named as scout and goalkeeper coach of his last club FC Energie Cottbus on 24 June 2009. On 12 February 2010, he was additionally named as the new goalkeeper coach of the Bosnia and Herzegovina national football team. On 15 October 2013, Bosnia and Herzegovina qualified for FIFA World Cup 2014.

On 5 January 2010, Piplica received his UEFA Pro Licence in Football Association of Bosnia and Herzegovina's educational facility in Jablanica, Bosnia and Herzegovina.

Besides Bosnia, as a head coach, he coached FC Eilenburg, SC Hartenfels Torgau 04, Norhausen as well as the reservers of SpVgg Bayreuth.

Personal life
He holds dual Bosnian and Croatian citizenship.

Honours

Player
Iskra Bugojno 
Yugoslav Second League (West): 1983–84
Mitropa Cup: 1984–85

Zagreb 
Yugoslav Second League: 1990–91
Yugoslav Third League (West): 1989–90

Yugoslavia Youth 
FIFA World Youth Championship: 1987

References

External links

1969 births
Living people
People from Bugojno
Croats of Bosnia and Herzegovina
Association football goalkeepers
Yugoslav footballers
Bosnia and Herzegovina footballers
Bosnia and Herzegovina international footballers
NK Iskra Bugojno players
NK Zagreb players
NK Istra players
HNK Segesta players
NK Samobor players
FC Energie Cottbus players
Second Football League (Croatia) players
First Football League (Croatia) players
Croatian Football League players
2. Bundesliga players
Bundesliga players
Landesliga players
Bosnia and Herzegovina expatriate footballers
Expatriate footballers in Croatia
Bosnia and Herzegovina expatriate sportspeople in Croatia
Expatriate footballers in Germany
Bosnia and Herzegovina expatriate sportspeople in Germany
Bosnia and Herzegovina football managers
Association football goalkeeping coaches